Privatdozent (for men) or Privatdozentin (for women), abbreviated PD, P.D. or Priv.-Doz., is an academic title conferred at some European universities, especially in German-speaking countries, to someone who holds certain formal qualifications that denote an ability (facultas docendi) and permission to teach (venia legendi) a designated subject at the highest level. To be granted the title Priv.-Doz. by a university, a recipient has to fulfill the criteria set by the university which usually require excellence in research, teaching, and further education. In its current usage, the title indicates that the holder has completed their habilitation and is therefore granted permission to teach and examine students independently without having a professorship.

Conferment and roles
A university faculty can confer the title to an academic who has a higher doctoral degree - usually in the form of a habilitation. The title, Privatdozent, as such does not imply a salaried appointment; it merely denotes permission to teach and examine independently at the conferring faculty without a professorial appointment. At German universities, some title holders are appointed as Dozent on a fee basis, or as senior researchers through externally funded research projects.

Many title holders do not have remuneration agreements with their conferring institution, but depending on local regulations may be required to teach in order to maintain their status as a Privatdozent. In 2012 more than 5,000 honorarium Privatdozenten worked at German universities without a salary.
A Privatdozent ceases to hold the title if appointed at professorial level or if discontinuing lecturing at the faculty. In Germany, the title can be revoked if the holder does not lecture for more than two consecutive semesters.

History and future
The title has its origins in German-speaking countries in Europe before 1800. It referred to a lecturer who received fees from his students rather than a university salary.

In Prussia it started around 1810, and became established around 1860. From 1900 until 1968, most university professors who were appointed were title holders, as they obtained a habilitation and already held a teaching position.

In Germany, since the end of the 1960s the requirement of a post-doctoral degree for a professorship has been questioned and in some cases became not always necessary. In 2002 junior professorships were introduced, providing a route to a professorship without habilitation; the habilitation is no longer the gold standard against which other qualifications are measured during the appointment process. This has led to a decline in universities conferring the title Privatdozent in certain academic disciplines.

References

Higher education in Germany
Academic terminology
Academic titles
German words and phrases